Paremhat 2 - Coptic Calendar - Paremhat 4

The third day of the Coptic month of Paremhat, the seventh month of the Coptic year. In common years, this day corresponds to February 27, of the Julian Calendar, and March 12, of the Gregorian Calendar. This day falls in the Coptic Season of Shemu, the season of the Harvest.

Commemorations

Martyrs 

 The martyrdom of Saint Porphyry

Saints 

 The departure of Pope Cosmas I, the 58th Patriarch of the See of Saint Mark 
 The departure of Saint Porphyry, Bishop of Gaza
 The departure of Saint Hadid the Priest

References 

Days of the Coptic calendar